Khaled Al-Khalidi (born 14 February 1965) is a Saudi Arabian athlete. He competed in the men's shot put at the 1992 Summer Olympics and the 1996 Summer Olympics.

References

1965 births
Living people
Athletes (track and field) at the 1992 Summer Olympics
Athletes (track and field) at the 1996 Summer Olympics
Saudi Arabian male shot putters
Saudi Arabian male discus throwers
Olympic athletes of Saudi Arabia
Place of birth missing (living people)
Athletes (track and field) at the 1994 Asian Games
Asian Games competitors for Saudi Arabia
21st-century Saudi Arabian people
20th-century Saudi Arabian people